Estonian Paralympic Committee was founded on April, 1991.

Members
Members (as of 2021):
 Eesti Invaspordi Liit
 Eesti Pimedate Spordiliit
 Eesti Vaimsete Puuetega Inimeste Spordiliit
 Estonian Deaf Sport Union
 Eesti Puuetega Inimeste Ujumisliit

References

External links
 

National Paralympic Committees
Paralympic
Estonia at the Paralympics
Sports organizations established in 1991
1991 establishments in Estonia
Disability organizations based in Estonia